Richard Benham (born August 1965) is Professor of Cyber Security Management at Coventry University.

Career

Coventry University appointed Benham to the Chair of Cyber Security Management in 2013, where together with the team at Coventry Business School he wrote and accredited The National MBA in Cyber Security. This degree received the personal support of the Prime Minister David Cameron and is the only degree to have been launched at The House of Commons with cross party support.
He also holds visiting Chairs at The University of Gloucestershire and Staffordshire University.

Since 2016 Benham has been a council member of The Winston Churchill Memorial Trust.

In March 2016 Benham wrote the Inaugural Institute of Directors Cyber White Paper ‘Cyber Security – underpinning the Digital Economy’.

In 2017 he founded The Cyber Trust, a charity to help educate disadvantaged groups on cyber and digital safety, chaired by Dame Janet Trotter, and in 2019 he established The National Cyber Awards.

Benham currently holds a British Army Officer commission with the rank of Major advising the Ministry of Defence on Cyber related matters.

Publications

Richard Benham, Cyber Risk Management, Kogan Page 2018.
Prof Richard Benham, ‘ Cyber Security Underpinning the digital economy’, Institute of Directors Policy Paper, March 2016
Richard Benham, ‘Cyber Security: Ensuring Business is Ready for the 21st Century’, Institute of Directors Policy Paper, March 2017.
Richard Benham, ‘Ten tips to help beat the hackers and stay safe online’, ITProPortal, February 2017.
Richard Benham, ‘The Cyber Ripple Theory’, in Dr A. Radley, Absolute Security: Theory and Principles of Secure Communication (2016). The Cyber Ripple Theory highlights the human aspect of an attack, defining what is human and at what point ‘cyber’ occurs.
James Barrington and Richard Benham, Cyberstrike: London, Canelo Books 2020.
James Barrington and Richard Benham, ‘’Cyberstrike: DC’’, Canelo Books 2021
Richard Benham, ‘Black Ops, Red Alert, PS Editions 2021

Notes

1965 births
Writers about computer security
Living people